The first season of The Kelly Clarkson Show began airing on September 9, 2019.

Episodes

References

External links
 

1
2019 American television seasons
2020 American television seasons